"Waking Up Dreaming" is a song co-written and recorded by Canadian singer Shania Twain, and released on September 23, 2022 and serves as the lead single from Twain's sixth studio album, Queen of Me (2023). The song was written by Jessica Agombar, David Stewart, and Twain.

Release
The song premiered on September 23, 2022, on BBC Radio 2 and was released to streaming and music purchasing platforms on the same day. It was the first single by Twain being released via the new record label Republic Nashville. Twain commented: "I couldn't think of a better partner than Republic Nashville. I'm honored and excited to be the label's first artist and lead the charge of this new and exciting chapter. In this respect, it feels like a new beginning all around, and I'm embracing it wholeheartedly."

Music video
The music video for "Waking Up Dreaming" was released on September 23, 2022, and depicts Twain as a 80s rockstar performing the song in extravagant rock fantasy clothing.  The video was directed by Isaac Rentz.

Live performance
Twain debuted the song live for the first time as part of a medley during her performance at the People's Choice Awards 2022. After the performance she received the music icon award.

Charts

References

External links
 

2022 singles
Republic Records singles
Shania Twain songs
Songs written by Shania Twain
2022 songs